Friendswood is a city in the U.S. state of Texas. It is part of the  metropolitan area.  The city lies in Galveston and Harris Counties.  As of the 2010 census, the population of Friendswood was 35,805.

In 2007, CNN/Money magazine listed Friendswood as one of 100 "America's Best Places to Live" for that year, making it one of 900 small towns recognized since the rankings first began in 2005.

History 
Friendswood, situated in the northwest corner of Galveston County, has the distinction of being the only permanent town in Texas that started as a Quaker colony. It was established in 1895 by a group of Quakers led by T. Hadley Lewis and Frank J. Brown. They were looking for a "promised land" to start a colony of the people who belonged to the religious denomination called Friends or Quakers.
 
From its founding, life in Friendswood revolved around church and school. After the small church and school building was demolished in the 1900 Storm, the two-dozen families living in Friendswood erected a large two-story frame structure for their church and school. The building, called The Academy, housed the school and sanctuary until a larger, stone building replaced it.
 
Through the 1940s, Friendswood was predominately a small, remote, farming Quaker community with less than 500 citizens. The economy depended largely on growing and preserving Magnolia figs. After 1950, it became increasingly a suburban bedroom community, as Houstonians discovered the idyllic country setting the farmlands were converted to subdivision home-sites. The community became a city when it incorporated in 1960.

Geography

Friendswood is located at  (29.512532, –95.197933).

Demographics

As of the 2020 United States census, there were 41,213 people, 13,540 households, and 10,427 families residing in the city.

As of the census of 2000, 29,037 people, 10,107 households, and 8,085 families resided in the city. The population density was 1,381.2 people per square mile (533.4/km). The 10,405 housing units averagedensity of 495.0 per square mile (191.1/km). The racial makeup of the city was 90.09% White, 2.70% African American, 0.40% Native American, 2.39% Asian, 2.80% from other races, and 1.63% from two or more races. Hispanics or Latinos of any race were 8.79% of the population.

Of the 10,107 households, 43.7% had children under the age of 18 living with them, 68.5% were married couples living together, 8.7% had a female householder with no husband present, and 20.0% were not families. About 17.0% of all households were made up of individuals, and 6.3% had someone living alone who was 65 years of age or older. The average household size was 2.85 and the average family size was 3.23.

In the city, the population was distributed as 30.0% under the age of 18, 6.2% from 18 to 24, 29.4% from 25 to 44, 25.7% from 45 to 64, and 8.6% who were 65 years of age or older. The median age was 37 years. For every 100 females, there were 93.7 males. For every 100 females age 18 and over, there were 90.4 males.

In 2010, the median income for a household was $115,439 and for a family was $128,898.  Males had a median income of $67,084 versus $35,447 for females. The per capita income for the city was $39,515. About 2.3% of families and 3.3% of the population were below the poverty line, including 3.4% of those under age 18 and 3.8% of those age 65 or over.

Government and infrastructure
The Friendswood Post Office is located at 310 Morningside Drive. Some locations in the City of Houston have Friendswood mailing addresses. NASA astronaut Michael Foreman was elected mayor in 2018.

Economy
The Baybrook Mall is physically located in the City of Houston, but has a Friendswood mailing address.

Education

Primary and secondary schools

Public schools
Students in Friendswood attend schools in either Friendswood Independent School District (FISD) if they live south of Clear Creek (Galveston County), or Clear Creek Independent School District (CCISD) if they live north of Clear Creek (Harris County). The CCISD portion is within the Board of Trustees District 4, represented by Stuart J. Stromeyer as of 2008.

Cline Elementary School, Westwood Elementary School, Bales Intermediate School, and Windsong Intermediate School serve the FISD portion of Friendswood. All FISD residents are zoned to Friendswood Junior High School and Friendswood High School.

CCISD students from Friendswood attend Wedgewood Elementary School in Friendswood, and Brookside Intermediate School in Friendswood. Most residents of CCISD Friendswood are zoned to Clear Brook High School in unincorporated Harris County, while some residents of CCISD Friendswood are zoned to Clear Springs High School in League City.

Students who live in the area around Friendswood, but are in unincorporated Harris County with address listed as Friendswood or Webster attend Greene Elementary School or Landolt Elementary School in unincorporated Harris County for elementary schools. For middle school they are zoned to Westbrook Intermediate School in Houston.

Public libraries
The Friendswood Public Library at 416 South Friendswood Drive serves Friendswood.

Colleges and universities
The Friendswood ISD area is assigned to College of the Mainland, while the portion of Clear Creek ISD in Harris County (and therefore the Harris County part of Friendswood) is assigned to San Jacinto College.

Notable people

 Greg Bonnen, neurosurgeon and Republican member of the Texas House of Representatives from Friendswood 
 Stephen Bowen, NASA astronaut and a United States Navy submariner.
 Katie Rose Clarke, Broadway actor, famous for the roles of Clara in Light in the Piazza, Glinda in Wicked, and Hannah in Allegiance 
 Robin Coleman, American Gladiator Hellga, 2001 World's Strongest Woman (bronze)
 Charles L. Cotton, president of the National Rifle Association (NRA)
 Penny Edwards, actress known for many western films; died in Friendswood
 R'Bonney Gabriel, beauty queen, model, fashion designer, Miss Universe 2022 
 Joseph Gutheinz, attorney and investigator of stolen and missing moon rocks
 Clara Harris, convicted murderer who made national and international headlines for murdering her husband by running him over with their car
 Bill McArthur, retired United States Army colonel and NASA astronaut
 Balor Moore, former MLB pitcher resides in Friendswood
 Ronnie Price, NBA basketball player
 Bruce Prichard, executive director for WWE and co-host of Something to Wrestle with Bruce Prichard
 Ryan Sitton, Republican nominee for the Texas Railroad Commission in the November 4, 2014, general election
 Steve Stockman, politician
 Booker T, and spouse Sharmell Sullivan-Huffman – professional wrestling personalities
 Larry Taylor, Republican member of the Texas Senate from District 11 (2013–Present) and Texas House of Representatives from District 24 (2003–2013)

Climate
The climate in this area is characterized by hot, humid summers and generally mild to cool winters. According to the Köppen climate classification, Friendswood has a humid subtropical climate, Cfa on climate maps.

Legacy
The 2014 novel Friendswood, set in the area, was written by René Steinke.

References

External links

 City of Friendswood official website
 
 Friendswood Public Library

Cities in Texas
Cities in Galveston County, Texas
Cities in Harris County, Texas
Greater Houston